Jacopo Chiavistelli  (1618 or 1621 – 27 April 1698) was an Italian painter of the Baroque period, active mainly in his native city of Florence. He trained with Fabrizio Boschi and Michelangelo Colonna. He painted quadratura or painted architecture for the Palazzo Cerretani in Florence.

References

Alessandro Gherardini, Prince Ferdinando de' Medici and the Pitti Palace, by Marco Chiarini The Burlington Magazine,  1985, page 762.

1618 births
1698 deaths
17th-century Italian painters
Italian male painters
Painters from Florence
Italian Baroque painters
Quadratura painters